Querary River is a river of Colombia. It is part of the Amazon River basin and is a tributary of the Vaupés River.

See also
List of rivers of Colombia

References

Rivers of Colombia